Paraflabellina gabinierei is a species of sea slug, an aeolid nudibranch, a marine gastropod mollusk in the family Piseinotecidae.

Distribution
This nudibranch was described from the islet of La Gabinière, Port-Cros National Park, France. It has since been found in La Ciotat, France, Antalya, Turkey, and Cadaques, Spain

Description
This nudibranch is translucent white in colour and reaches 30 mm in length. The tips of the rhinophores, oral tentacles and tail are dusted with white. The digestive gland in the cerata is dark brown, green or possibly red and there is no pigment on the surfaces of the cerata. The rhinophores have small annular wrinkles.

Ecology
Paraflabellina gabinierei feeds on hydroids of the genus Eudendrium.

References

External links
 

Flabellinidae
Gastropods described in 1976